Low Estate is the second full-length album by 16 Horsepower. Released in 1997, only a year after Sackcloth 'n' Ashes, it drew heavily upon compositions pre-dating the band's first album.

Track listing 

 "Brimstone Rock" (Edwards/16 Horsepower) – 4:29
 "My Narrow Mind" (Edwards/16 Horsepower) – 2:59
 "Low Estate" (Edwards/16 Horsepower) – 4:10
 "For Heaven's Sake" (Edwards/16 Horsepower) – 4:54
 "Sac of Religion" (Edwards/Norlander/16 Horsepower) – 3:28
 "The Denver Grab" (Edwards/Norlander/16 Horsepower) – 5:03
 "Ditch Digger" (Edwards/16 Horsepower) – 3:22
 "Pure Clob Road" (Edwards/16 Horsepower) – 3:43
 "Phyllis Ruth" (Edwards/16 Horsepower) – 4:36
 "Black Lung" (Edwards/16 Horsepower) – 2:26
 "Dead Run" (Edwards/16 Horsepower) – 3:20
 "Golden Rope" (Edwards/16 Horsepower) – 4:15
 "Hang My Teeth on Your Door" (Norlander/16 Horsepower) – 2:36

Charts

Personnel

 David Eugene Edwards – Vocals, Banjo, Guitar, Hurdy-gurdy, Concertina
 Jeffrey-Paul Norlander – Back-up Vocals, Fiddle, Cello, Organ
 Jean-Yves Tola – Drums, Percussion, Piano
 Pascal Humbert – Bass guitar, Bass fiddle, Guitar
 John Parish – Additional Percussion, Organ, Guitar, Xylophone
 Steve Taylor – Guitar on "Phyllis Ruth"

Trivia

 John Parish was thought of as a producer for the album because the band was impressed with his work on Dance Hall at Louse Point.
 The album was also released in a French Version and a "Nouvelle Version" with slightly different track lists. Most notably, the Nouvelle Version also included a rendition of the Gun Club song "Fire Spirit" and Marly/d'Astier composition "The Partisan", both with the participation of Bertrand Cantat, as well as a re-recording of "Coal Black Horses", originally featured on the 16 Horsepower EP.

References

1997 albums
16 Horsepower albums
A&M Records albums
Albums produced by John Parish